Benedikt Brueckner (born January 1, 1990) is a German professional ice hockey defenceman. He is currently playing for Schwenninger Wild Wings in the Deutsche Eishockey Liga (DEL). Brueckner has previously played in the DEL with Adler Mannheim and the Straubing Tigers On May 7, 2013, after two seasons with the Tigers, Brueckner signed a one-year contract with DEL rival, EHC München. After two seasons with Red Bull, Brueckner signed a two-year contract with his fourth DEL club, Schwenninger Wild Wings on March 23, 2015.

References

External links

1990 births
Living people
Adler Mannheim players
German ice hockey defencemen
EHC München players
Schwenninger Wild Wings players
Straubing Tigers players